The 1950 United States Senate election in North Dakota took place on November 7, 1950. Incumbent Republican Senator Milton Young ran for re-election to a second term. In the Republican primary, he faced former Lieutenant Governor Thorstein H. Thoresen, who was endorsed by the Nonpartisan League. After winning the primary in a landslide, he faced State Senator Harry O'Brien, the Democratic nominee, in the general election. Aided by the national Republican landslide, Young defeated O'Brien in a landslide to win re-election.

Democratic Primary

Candidates
 Harry O'Brien, State Senator from Walsh County
 Joseph E. Kyllonen, veteran

Results

Republican Primary

Candidates
 Milton Young, incumbent U.S. Senator
 Thorstein H. Thoresen, former Lieutenant Governor of North Dakota

Results

General election

Results

References

1950
North Dakota
United States Senate